Ridgefield Township was a township that existed in Bergen County, New Jersey. The township was created in 1871, when Hackensack Township was trisected to form Palisades Township in the northernmost third, Englewood Township in the central strip and Ridgefield Township encompassing the southernmost portion, stretching from the Hudson River on the east to the Hackensack River, with Hudson County to the south. Much of the area had been during the colonial area known as the English Neighborhood. As described in the 1882 book, History of Bergen and Passaic counties, New Jersey, 

In 1878, the New Jersey Legislature provided for the formation of a borough within a township not exceeding four square miles. Three years later, Rutherford became the first borough to be formed under that Act when it separated from Union Township to the southwest of Ridgefield.  Ridgefield Borough was set off from Ridgefield Township in 1892, and Ridgefield Park Village was formed within the township that same year.

The passage of a revised Borough Act resulted in a flurry of subdivision of new boroughs. Municipalities created from Ridgefield Township (or portions thereof) were Bogota (1894), Leonia (1894), Undercliff (1894; renamed to "Edgewater" in 1899), Fairview (1894), Teaneck (part) (1895), Cliffside Park (1895), Englewood (part) (1895), Palisades Park (1899). The creation of Fort Lee, New Jersey on April 18, 1904 put an end to Ridgefield Township.

Notes

References
"History of Bergen County, New Jersey, 1630-1923;" by "Westervelt, Frances A. (Frances Augusta), 1858-1942."
"Municipal Incorporations of the State of New Jersey (according to Counties)" prepared by the Division of Local Government, Department of the Treasury (New Jersey); December 1, 1958.

External links
Bergen County Townships and Municipalities

Former townships in Bergen County, New Jersey
Ridgefield, New Jersey
Palisades Park, New Jersey
Leonia, New Jersey
Englewood, New Jersey
Fort Lee, New Jersey
Cliffside Park, New Jersey
Edgewater, New Jersey
Bogota, New Jersey
Fairview, Bergen County, New Jersey
Former townships in New Jersey